Herbal Magic is a Canadian weight loss and nutrition company based in Toronto, Ontario that previously operated over 300 weight loss and nutrition centers across Canada as the nation’s largest commercial weight loss company. Today, Herbal Magic operates as an online e-commerce store offering natural health products, wellness accessories, and weight loss programs with virtual weight loss coaching administered via live video, telephone, and email.

History 
Herbal Magic was founded in 1995 by Dieter Decker, who opened his first weight loss and nutrition center in London, Ontario. After growing the business to 228 centers nationwide (220 in Canada, and 8 under the name Nutri Magic in Michigan), Decker sold the company in December 2003 to Trivest, a Miami, Florida-based private investment firm. Trivest appointed Tom McNeely of Tim Hortons as CEO, and the number of units grew by nearly 45%, to 300 stores. In the summer of 2006, Trivest hired CIBC World Markets to launch an auction of Herbal Magic.  In October 2006, Herbal Magic was sold to TorQuest Partners. 

During 2009, Cameron Capital, a Toronto-based firm whose investments include Hair Club for Men and Beauty First, invested in the business. On February 18, 2009, the company announced a change in ownership making new investments in Herbal Magic Inc., including a personal investment from incoming Chairman Steve Hudson. The principles of Cameron Capital became managing partners of Herbal Magic, overseeing both strategic and daily operations. On August 7, 2015, the company restructured and closed all of its central and eastern Canada stores. Its 41 western Canada stores were taken over by a secured lender and closed in 2016. 

Since 2016, Herbal Magic weight loss plans and supplements have remained available to Canadians coast to coast through various distributors, as well as their national coaching center in Mississauga, Ontario run by President Troy Nahmiache. All Herbal Magic weight loss programs are now provided virtually through video calls, telephone, and email by certified Personal Health Coaches.

Program 
The Herbal Magic program offers a combination of private one-on-one personal coaching, real food bought at your grocery store, and natural health products. It has weight loss programs designed for women, men, people with diabetes (type I and II), women who are planning to conceive, women postpartum (whether they are breastfeeding or not), and those with diagnosed heart conditions. The programs are designed to help clients lose weight at an average rate of two pounds per week. Prior to entering Phase 1, a personal health coach reviews the client's medical history to map out the client’s weight loss journey and customizable meal plan with natural health products to optimize healthy weight loss. Once the coach and client align on the goal and journey, they enter the program: 

 Phase 1: Kickstarter. This two-day phase is a cleanse designed to kick-start the client and their body on the program. Once the two days are completed, the client moves on to Phase 2.  
 Phase 2: Determination. In this phase, the personal health coaches teach  clients how to customize their meal plans and use allotments to build their own menus (this info is provided to the clients before Phase 1 even begins, however, it is utilized in Phase 2). The client is in this phase until they lose their first 10 pounds. Once the first 10 pounds are lost, clients moves to Phase 3.  
 Phase 3: Transformation. In this phase, clients will have access to more diverse foods, while continuing to meet with their coach and take their supplements. Clients are in this phase until they reach their goal weight. Once that is achieved, clients move on to Phase 4.   

 Phase 4: Maintenance. Regardless of the weight loss goal, clients are in Phase 4 for 6 weeks. During this time, they  will learn how to keep the weight off for good.

Products 
Herbal Magic's Scientific Advisory Team researches and designs all of its products and programs. Developed by a team of pharmacological manufacturing companies, naturopathic doctors, registered dietitians, and pharmacists, Herbal Magic natural health products are designed to support weight control and promote overall health and energy. The products consist of herbs, nutraceuticals, vitamins, and minerals. As of July 2012, all 46 of Herbal Magic's Natural Health Products have received Natural Product Numbers (NPNs) which means that they are licensed for sale in Canada and have had their safety, efficacy, and quality approved by Health Canada.

Criticism 
The February 5, 2010 episode of the investigative news program CBC Marketplace examined the health effects of Herbal Magic's optional supplement products. The program and its independent experts determined there was insufficient empirical evidence to convince them that the supplements facilitate weight loss. Accordingly, the documentary claimed it observed Herbal Magic salespeople using tactics that lead customers to overestimate the supplements' effectiveness. Marketplace also interpreted Herbal Magic's practice of only telling customers the cost of the program after a free consultation as disingenuous.

Advertising 
In September 2008, Herbal Magic began its first national advertising campaign. The initiative, aimed primarily at women, consisted of television, print, and online advertising. The advertisements encouraged women to rediscover a sense of self. Another campaign launched in February 2010, focuses on real clients who have claimed to have lost weight and kept it off, including Susan Crenshaw. Crenshaw was the former TV host of HGTV's This Small Space. Spokespersons for the program have included former Deputy Prime Minister Sheila Copps, former Toronto Maple Leafs General Manager Gord Stellick, and Canadian figure skater Elizabeth Manley who, since 2009, has waged a highly publicized battle with her weight. Advertising efforts have focused on building brand awareness of Herbal Magic.

2010 Weight Loss Cup
From July to October 2010, Herbal Magic and the Canadian Football League (CFL) co-sponsored a highly publicized Weight Loss Cup. Eight Canadian Football League alumni engaged in an amiable 20-week competition to lose weight and adopt a healthier lifestyle, using Herbal Magic’s old program. They included Gerry Dattilio of the Calgary Stampeders, Ralph Scholz of the Hamilton Tiger-Cats, Chris Walby of the Blue Bombers, Gerald Roper of the BC Lions, Eric Upton of the Edmonton Eskimos, Andre Greene of the Saskatchewan Roughriders, Doug Smith of the Montreal Alouettes, and Paul Markle of the Toronto Argonauts. Gerry Dattilio achieved the most points and was crowned the Weight Loss Cup Champion. Fans could vote online for their favourite player. Besides weekly prizes for voting, voters could win a grand prize of a trip for two to the Grey Cup.

References

External links
 

Dietary supplements
Companies based in Toronto
Canadian companies established in 1995
1995 establishments in Ontario
Brand name diet products
Companies that have filed for bankruptcy in Canada